Nipponocypris temminckii (common name: the Dark chub) is a species of cyprinid in the genus Nipponocypris.

References

Cyprinidae
Cyprinid fish of Asia
Freshwater fish of China
Fish of Japan
Fish of Korea
Taxa named by Coenraad Jacob Temminck
Taxa named by Hermann Schlegel
Fish described in 1846